is an Echizen Railway Katsuyama Eiheiji Line railway station located in  Eiheiji, Yoshida District, Fukui Prefecture, Japan.

Lines

Station layout
The station consists of one side platform serving  single bi-directional line. The station is unattended.

Adjacent stations

History
Shiizakai Station was opened on February 11, 1914. Operations were halted from June 25, 2001. The station reopened on July 20, 2003 as an Echizen Railway station.

Surrounding area
The station sits atop a hill near a residential area.
The Kuzuryū River and  lie to the north.

See also
 List of railway stations in Japan

External links

  

Railway stations in Fukui Prefecture
Railway stations in Japan opened in 1914
Katsuyama Eiheiji Line
Eiheiji, Fukui